Sarah Island is an island in the Hingham Bay area of the Boston Harbor Islands National Recreation Area. The ledges, beaches and mudflats make the ideal nesting place for gulls.

The island was purchased by John Langlee in 1686, later passing to John R. Brewer, at the time the owner of nearby World's End. Today it is managed by the town of Hingham and access is by private boat only. Access by humans is discouraged during the nesting season.

References

Boston Harbor islands
Hingham, Massachusetts
Coastal islands of Massachusetts
Islands of Plymouth County, Massachusetts